Menemerus nigli is a species of jumping spider in the genus Menemerus that originates in Asia. The male was identified in 2012 by Wanda Wesołowska and Mario Freudenschuss, and the female by Pir Asmat Ali, Wayne Maddison. Muhammad Zahid and Abida Buttin in 2018. The spider is medium-sized, typically  in length, with a dark brown carapace and grey-brown abdomen that has a distinctive cream and white pattern created by small hairs. It was originally found in India, Pakistan and Thailand but was also found to have been introduced into Latin America, the first specimens being identified in Brazil in 2020. It seems to thrive amongst the sunlit stucco walls that are common in cities across the region. Menemerus nigli is used as an example of the ability of species that adapt to human habitation to expand their ecological niche and become global species.

Taxonomy

First described by Wanda Wesołowska and Mario Freudenschuss in 2012, the spider was allocated to the genus Menemerus. It is one of over 500 species identified by the Polish arachnologist over her career. The genus was first described in 1868 by Eugène Simon and contains over 60 species. The genus name derives from two Greek words, meaning certainly and diurnal. The genus shares some characteristics, including having narrow, oval, fixed embolus, with the genera Hypaeus and Pellenes. Genetic analysis has shown that the genus is related to the genera Helvetia and Phintella and is classified in the tribe Chrysillini. The species is dedicated to Johannes Nigl, a mentor and friend of Freudenschuss.

Description

Initially, only the male of the species was identified, with the first description of the female being by Pir Asmat Ali, Wayne Maddison. Muhammad Zahid and Abida Buttin in 2018. The male is slightly smaller than the female. The carapace is dark brown and oval, with dense white hairs making it look as if the spider has a streak of white across it. The abdomen is smaller and narrower than the carapace, and a brownish-grey. The abdomen has cream markings and white hairs. These give a distinctive pattern. 

The male is similar to two other species in the same genus, Menemerus pilosus and Menemerus zimbabwensis, both found in Africa, differing in the abdominal pattern.  The embolus is larger than other species in the genus. The female is distinguished from other Menemerus species by the distinctive folds that extend from the broad forward-facing copulatory duct, as shown in Figure 11. The epigyne has a wide opening. The pedipalps are brown, but those on the female are lighter in colour. The juvenile male is generally darker in appearance and can be identified by its club-shaped cymbium at the end of its pedipalp. The adult male has white hairs on the side of the chelicerae.

Distribution and habitat
Menemerus nigli has been found in India, Pakistan and Thailand. The spider was first identified in western Pakistan by Wanda Wesołowska and Mario Freudenschuss. This was the second example of the genus to be identified in the country. A specimen in West Bengal, India, was confirmed as being from the same species by comparing the DNA barcode in 2017. It was the fifth species of the genus found in the country.  The spider was also identified in Thailand in 2020.

Many of the images of Menemerus fulvus posted online may depict Menemerus nigli and so the species's distribution may be over a wider area of south and south-east Asia than has been confirmed. The spider has also successfully established itself in Latin America. In 2020, Rafael M. Mariante and David E. Hill identified examples of the species from three sites in Rio de Janeiro, Brazil.

The spider was first found under stones. It was also subsequently found to live on stoney ground, on indoor walls and on exterior walls. It seems to be comfortable in ruins as well as places of current habitation. However, it seems to particularly thrive on the painted and stuccoed walls that can be found in cities like Rio de Janeiro and others across the region. The evidence that it has found a niche in urban structures supports the view that species that can adapt to habitats created by people may be more successful when introduced to a new and far away habitat.

References

Citations

Bibliography

Arthropods of Thailand
Fauna of Pakistan
Salticidae
Spiders described in 2012
Spiders of Asia
Spiders of Brazil
Spiders of the Indian subcontinent
Taxa named by Wanda Wesołowska